Gisela Ponce de León Franco, (born 12 April 1985) is a Peruvian film, television and stage actress and singer. Gisela began working professionally as a child actor on the musical Annie and in other productions. She appeared in several more musicals before being selected for the lead role in the hit TV show Esta Sociedad. In Peru, she played as Sofia in the musical Mama Mia.<ref>[http://www.terra.com.pe/resumen-2008/gisela-ponce-de-leon.html Los Personajes del año 2008: Gisela Ponce de León]</ref>

In her country has starred in the musicals Cabaret, La Cage aux Folles, Next to normal and Our Town. She played Mary Warren in Las Brujas de Salem, Rachel Corrie in My Name Is Rachel Corrie and Penny Pingleton in Hairspray''.

Early life
Gisela used to live in Cercado de Lima and study at Colegio de Jesús. When she was a child, she took ballet, singing and dancing classes. As an adolescent, she participated in Nubeluz.

Career
After being part of several TV shows, Gisela decided to apply to the ETUC (Pontificia Universidad Católica del Perú's Theatre School).

She made her debut as a film actress in the short film "Besando a tu papá" (Kissing your dad) at 2007 and lent her voice to the role of Tiffany in the Peruvian animated film "Valentino y el clan del can" (Valentino and the dongs' clan) the next year.

At 2010, Ponce de Leon participated in "El Gran Show", a reality show whose hostess was Gisela Varcárcel. She took the first place. Parallel, she starred two musicals: "El Musical 2010" and "La Cage aux Folles".

She served as the opening act for the Paramore's South America Tour at 2011. She started her career as a radio hostess in the radio station Studio92 at 2012 and as a TV hostess in the Frecuencia Latina's programme "Ponte Play" the next year.

Theatre

Filmography

References

External links 

 
 

1985 births
Living people
Peruvian female dancers
Peruvian musical theatre actresses
Peruvian film actresses
Peruvian television actresses
20th-century Peruvian actresses
21st-century Peruvian actresses